Rachel Klein may refer to:

Rachel Klein (chef), American chef
Rachel Klein (novelist), American novelist, translator and essayist